Gili Landau (born 7 May 1958) is an Israeli former footballer and currently a manager, coaching the Israel women's national football team.

Early life
Landau was born in Bat Yam, Israel.

He played soccer as a striker for Hapoel Tel Aviv for 17 years, from 1974–90, 12 matches for the Israel national football team, and earned a gold medal playing for Team Israel at the 1977 Maccabiah Games. He won three national championships, and one national cup.

Managerial career

Landau has coached Hapoel Bat Yam, Maccabi Herlzliya, Hapoel Be'er Sheva, Hakoah Ramat Gan, Maccabi Kiryat Gat, Maccabi Netanya, Hapoel Tel Aviv, Hapoel Bnei Lod, Hapoel Petah Tikva, Ironi Kiryat Shmona, F.C. Ashdod (sport director), and Agudat Sport Ashdod.

He was appointed as the coach of the Israel women's national football team in July 2021.

Honours
As player
Israeli Premier League (3):
1980-81, 1985–86, 1987–88
Israel State Cup (1):
1983

References

1958 births
Living people
Association football forwards
Competitors at the 1977 Maccabiah Games
F.C. Ashdod
Hakoah Ramat Gan
Hapoel Ashdod F.C.
Hapoel Be'er Sheva F.C. managers
Hapoel Ramat Gan F.C. managers
Hapoel Bat Yam F.C.
Hapoel Tel Aviv F.C. managers
Hapoel Bnei Lod F.C. managers
Hapoel Petah Tikva F.C. managers
Hapoel Ironi Kiryat Shmona F.C. managers
Hapoel Tel Aviv F.C. players
Israeli Jews
Israeli footballers
Israeli football managers
Israel international footballers
Maccabi Herzliya F.C. managers
Maccabi Kiryat Gat F.C. managers
Maccabi Netanya F.C. managers
Maccabiah Games gold medalists for Israel
Maccabiah Games medalists in football
Footballers from Bat Yam
Israeli people of Polish-Jewish descent